

Kantō (Japanese)

In Japan
Kantō may refer to:
Kantō Plain
Kantō region
Kantō-kai, organized crime group
Kanto (Pokémon), a geographical region in the Pokémon media franchise, named after the Japanese region of the same name
Kantō is a festival held in Akita every year.
Akita Kanto (Japanese: 竿燈)

In Northeast China or Manchuria

Kantō may refer to the region of Jiandao (Japanese: 間島 Kantō) in Manchuria, now known more commonly as Yanbian.

Kantō (関東) is an alternate name for Northeast China or Manchuria used in the following:
Kwantung Army (Japanese: 関東軍 Kantōgun), a unit of the Imperial Japanese Army
Kwantung Leased Territory (Japanese: 関東州 Kantōshū), a Japanese possession in Northeastern China until the end of World War II

Kanto (Italian)

Kanto (music) is a form of Italian theatre and opera popular in Turkey.
Kanto (comics), a fictional character in the Mr. Miracle series.

Kanto (Korean)

Kanto (rapper), a South Korean rapper under Brand New Music.

Kanto (other)
KANTO - National Agent Data authority file and name database for persons and corporate bodies

pt:Kanto